Daniele D'Anza (20 April 1922 – 12 April 1984) was an Italian director, playwright and screenwriter.

Life and career 
Born in Milan, D'Anza started his career on stage, in which he is best known for the direction of the antimilitarist play Venticinque metri di fango that he presented in Milan in 1946 raising several controversities as well as critical appreciation. Another of his works, the rivista  Tempo di musica, a satire of Italian history from the 19030s to the 1950s, was heavily censored, being first banned and later allowed only after having received heavy cuts.

He is regarded as a pioneer of Italian television, for which he worked since the early 1950s, when RAI started experimental broadcasting before starting the regular TV service. He directed several successful TV-series, in particular Il segno del comando (1971) and L'amaro caso della Baronessa di Carini (1976).  His last work, the TV miniseries La ragazza dell'addio was broadcast on RAI posthumously, two months after his dead. He was also active on films, notably working on the screenplay of Michelangelo Antonioni's Story of a Love Affair (1950).

Personal life 
D'Anza was first married to Edith Malanesan, a British woman, and they had a daughter, Cristina. The couple separated (divorce not yet existing in Italy) in 1950 and in 1967 he was prosecuted for concubinage with the actress Luisella Boni, with whom he had had a second daughter, Vittoria Michaela.

Selected filmography

Screenwriter
 Story of a Love Affair (1950)
 The Two Sergeants (1951)
 The Temptress (1952)
 Tom Toms of Mayumba (1955)
 The Wanderers (1956)

Director
 The Adventures of Nicholas Nickleby (1958, TV series)
 Call Girls of Rome (1960)
Il segno del comando (1971, TV series)
 Extra (1976)
 Madame Bovary (1978, TV series)
 I racconti fantastici di Edgar Allan Poe (1979, TV series)

References

External links 
 

1922 births
1984 deaths
20th-century Italian screenwriters
Italian film directors
Mass media people from Milan
Italian male screenwriters
20th-century Italian male writers